Robert Walter Mattick (May 30, 1933 – December 23, 2018) was an American basketball player.  He played collegiately at Oklahoma A&M University (now Oklahoma State) and was named a second team All-American in 1954.

Mattick, a 6'11 center from Chicago, played for Oklahoma A&M from 1951–54.  Mattick was a star for the Aggies and one of the premier big men in college basketball his last two seasons.  Mattick was named All-Missouri Valley Conference both years, and led the Aggies to two NCAA tournament bids in 1953 and 1954.  As a senior, Bob Mattick became the first player in Oklahoma A&M (now called Oklahoma State) history to average more than 20 points per game (20.7) and the first to average a double-double (20.7 points, 11.2 rebounds per game).  He was named a consensus second team All-American that year.  He finished with 1,378 points (16.6 per game) and 772 rebounds (9.3 per game) for his three-year career.

Following the completion of his college career, Mattick was drafted by the Milwaukee Hawks in the 1954 NBA draft.  However, he never played in the NBA, instead opting for the Phillips 66ers of the Amateur Athletic Union.

References

1933 births
2018 deaths
All-American college men's basketball players
American men's basketball players
Basketball players from Chicago
Centers (basketball)
Milwaukee Hawks draft picks
Oklahoma State Cowboys basketball players
Phillips 66ers players